In mathematics, the nth cyclotomic polynomial, for any positive integer n, is the unique irreducible polynomial with integer coefficients that is a divisor of  and is not a divisor of  for any  Its roots are all nth primitive roots of unity 
, where k runs over the positive integers not greater than n and coprime to n (and i is the imaginary unit). In other words, the nth cyclotomic polynomial is equal to

It may also be defined as the monic polynomial with integer coefficients that is the minimal polynomial over the field of the rational numbers of any primitive nth-root of unity ( is an example of such a root).

An important relation linking cyclotomic polynomials and primitive roots of unity is

showing that  is a root of  if and only if it is a dth primitive root of unity for some d that divides n.

Examples

If n is a prime number, then 

If n = 2p where p is an odd prime number, then

For n up to 30, the cyclotomic polynomials are:

The case of the 105th cyclotomic polynomial is interesting because 105 is the least positive integer that is the product of three distinct odd prime numbers (3*5*7) and this polynomial is the first one that has a coefficient other than 1, 0, or −1:

Properties

Fundamental tools

The cyclotomic polynomials are monic polynomials with integer coefficients that are irreducible over the field of the rational numbers. Except for n equal to 1 or 2, they are palindromics of even degree.

The fact that  is an irreducible polynomial of degree  in the ring  is a nontrivial result due to Gauss. Depending on the chosen definition, it is either the value of the degree or the irreducibility which is a nontrivial result. The case of prime n is easier to prove than the general case, thanks to Eisenstein's criterion.

A fundamental relation involving cyclotomic polynomials is 

which means that each n-th root of unity is a primitive d-th root of unity for a unique d dividing n.

where  is the Möbius function.

The cyclotomic polynomial  may be computed by (exactly) dividing  by the cyclotomic polynomials of the proper divisors of n previously computed recursively by the same method:

(Recall that .)

This formula defines an algorithm for computing  for any n, provided integer factorization and division of polynomials are available. Many computer algebra systems, such as SageMath, Maple, Mathematica, and PARI/GP, have a built-in function to compute the cyclotomic polynomials.

Easy cases for computation
As noted above, if  is a prime number, then

If n is an odd integer greater than one, then 

In particular, if  is twice an odd prime, then (as noted above)

If  is a prime power (where p is prime), then

To deal with this case, one has that, for  prime and not dividing ,

Integers appearing as coefficients

The problem of bounding the magnitude of the coefficients of the cyclotomic polynomials has been the object of a number of research papers.
 

The first cyclotomic polynomial for a product of three different odd prime factors is  it has a coefficient −2 (see its expression above). The converse is not true:  only has coefficients in {1, −1, 0}.

If n is a product of more different odd prime factors, the coefficients may increase to very high values. E.g.,  has coefficients running from −22 to 23, the smallest n with 6 different odd primes, has coefficients of magnitude up to 532.

Let A(n) denote the maximum absolute value of the coefficients of Φn.  It is known that for any positive k, the number of n up to x with A(n) > nk is at least c(k)⋅x for a positive c(k) depending on k and x sufficiently large.  In the opposite direction, for any function ψ(n) tending to infinity with n we have A(n) bounded above by nψ(n) for almost all n.

Gauss's formula

Let n be odd, square-free, and greater than 3. Then:

where  both An(z) and Bn(z) have integer coefficients, An(z) has degree φ(n)/2, and Bn(z) has degree φ(n)/2 − 2. Furthermore, An(z) is palindromic when its degree is even; if its degree is odd it is antipalindromic. Similarly, Bn(z) is palindromic unless n is composite and ≡ 3 (mod 4), in which case it is antipalindromic.

The first few cases are

Lucas's formula

Let n be odd, square-free and greater than 3. Then

where  both Un(z) and Vn(z) have integer coefficients, Un(z) has degree φ(n)/2, and Vn(z) has degree φ(n)/2 − 1. This can also be written

If n is even, square-free and greater than 2 (this forces n/2 to be odd),

where both Cn(z) and Dn(z) have integer coefficients, Cn(z) has degree φ(n), and Dn(z) has degree φ(n) − 1. Cn(z) and Dn(z) are both palindromic.

The first few cases are:

Cyclotomic polynomials over a finite field and over the -adic integers 

These results are also true over the -adic integers, since Hensel's lemma allows lifting a factorization over the field with  elements to a factorization over the -adic integers.

Polynomial values

If  takes any real value, then  for every  (this follows from the fact that the roots of a cyclotomic polynomial are all non-real, for ).

For , one has

 if  is not a prime power,

The definition of the multiplicative order implies that, if  is the multiplicative order of  modulo , then  is a divisor of  The converse is not true, but one has the following.

where 
  is a non-negative integer, always equal to 0 when  is even. (In fact, if  is neither 1 nor 2, then  is either 0 or 1. Besides, if  is not a power of 2, then  is always equal to 0)

In the latter case,  does not divide 

 

It follows from above factorization that the odd prime factors of

are exactly the odd primes  such that  is the multiplicative order of  modulo . This fraction may be even only when  is odd. In this case, the multiplicative order of  modulo  is always .

There are many pairs  with  such that  is prime. In fact, Bunyakovsky conjecture implies that, for every , there are infinitely many  such that  is prime.

 Values of  If  is a prime power, then 
 

Let  be a prime divisor of  such that  is not be the multiplicative order of  modulo . Thus  divides this resultant. As  divides , and the resultant of two polynomials divides the discriminant of any common multiple of these polynomials,  divides also the discriminant  of  Thus  divides .

 is square-free. It suffices to prove that  does not divide  for some polynomial , which is a multiple of  We take 
 
Now, 
 
As  is prime and greater than 2, all the terms but the first one are multiples of  This proves that

Applications

Using , one can give an elementary proof for the infinitude of primes congruent to 1 modulo n, which is a special case of Dirichlet's theorem on arithmetic progressions.

Suppose  is a finite list of primes congruent to  modulo  Let  and consider . Since  we know that  is a new prime not in the list. We will show that 

Let  be the order of  modulo  Since  we have . Thus .  We will show that .

Assume for contradiction that . Since 

 

we have 

 

Then  is a double root of 

Thus  must be a root of the derivative so 

But  and therefore  This is a contradiction so . Thus

See also
 Cyclotomic field
 Aurifeuillean factorization
 Root of unity

Notes

References

Gauss's book Disquisitiones Arithmeticae has been translated from Latin into English and German. The German edition includes all of his papers on number theory: all the proofs of quadratic reciprocity, the determination of the sign of the Gauss sum, the investigations into biquadratic reciprocity, and unpublished notes.

External links

Polynomials
Algebra
Number theory